Rodrigo de Oliveira Longaray (born 12 May 1985 in Porto Alegre) is a Brazilian footballer currently playing as a midfielder for Cerro Largo of the Uruguayan Primera División.

External links
  (archive)
 
 
 
 

1985 births
Living people
Brazilian footballers
Footballers from Porto Alegre
Association football midfielders
Brazilian expatriate footballers
Cerro Largo F.C. players
Expatriate footballers in Uruguay
Brazilian expatriate sportspeople in Uruguay